Hōnaunau-Nāpōopoo is a census-designated place (CDP) in Hawaii County, Hawaii, United States. The population was 2,416 at the 2020 census.

Geography
It is bordered to the north by the Captain Cook CDP and to the west by the Pacific Ocean. It contains the unincorporated community of Hōnaunau in the southwest corner of the CDP, on Hōnaunau Bay, and Nāpōopoo in the northwest corner, on Kealakekua Bay.

Hawaii Route 11 is the main road through the CDP, leading north  to Kailua-Kona and south  to Nāālehu. Hawaii Route 160 winds downhill from Route 11 to connect the communities of Hōnaunau and Nāpōopoo.

Nāpōopoo has a tropical monsoon climate (Köppen Am) with uniformly warm temperatures year-round.

Demographics

2000 census

As of the census of 2000, there were 2,414 people, 846 households, and 591 families residing in the CDP. There were 944 housing units at an average density of 24.8 per square mile (9.6/km2). The racial makeup of the CDP was 35.29% White, 0.29% African American, 0.87% Native American, 17.48% Asian, 14.21% Pacific Islander, 2.07% from other races, and 29.78% from two or more races. Hispanic or Latino of any race were 6.13% of the population. There were 846 households, out of which 30.1% had children under the age of 18 living with them, 50.4% were married couples living together, 11.9% had a female householder with no husband present, and 30.1% were non-families. 20.3% of all households were made up of individuals, and 5.2% had someone living alone who was 65 years of age or older. The average household size was 2.85 and the average family size was 3.35.

In the CDP the population was spread out, with 25.1% under the age of 18, 8.2% from 18 to 24, 23.7% from 25 to 44, 31.0% from 45 to 64, and 11.9% who were 65 years of age or older.  The median age was 40 years. For every 100 females, there were 104.6 males.  For every 100 females age 18 and over, there were 104.5 males. The median income for a household in the CDP was $41,912, and the median income for a family was $47,679. Males had a median income of $31,201 versus $24,453 for females. The per capita income for the CDP was $20,025.  About 11.6% of families and 13.5% of the population were below the poverty line, including 12.8% of those under age 18 and 5.8% of those age 65 or over.

Education
Hawaii Department of Education operates public schools. Hōnaunau Elementary School is in the CDP.

Climate data
The climate data for Hōnaunau-Nāpōopoo is retrieved from the Desert Research Institute's Western Regional Climate Center.

References

Census-designated places in Hawaii County, Hawaii
Populated places on Hawaii (island)
Populated coastal places in Hawaii